The technical crew, often abbreviated to the "tech crew" or simply the "crew" (individually often known as "techies", "techs", or "technicians"), are the people employed behind the scenes ("backstage") to control all the technical aspects of creating a concert, play, musical, opera or other live performance. The technical crew can consist of only a few individuals, or be divided up into a multitude of positions depending on the scale and needs of a particular production.

The roles, composition and number of workers in a tech crew can change significantly depending on the nature of an event, and often evolves as the production does. In a small scale production, the technical crew might consist of a single person, operating the lights and controlling the volume of the sounds and music. In a large scale productions, the technical crew can consist of dozens of different departments and may run into the hundreds of individuals. Each department has their own specific job that pertains to their area of expertise, but they are all part of the technical crew.

Job categories

The technical crew on a performance fall into different categories based on area of expertise and responsibilities.  The most common categories (those encountered on the largest variety of productions) include: Stage Manager, Production Manager, Rigging, Lighting, Sound, and Technical Directors. Each of these departments have sub-categories, often breaking down tasks in more detail.

Responsibilities
Theatre technical crew have significant responsibilities with regard to ensuring that a production runs smoothly. A Stage Manager has to give the cue to the Audio Engineer and Lighting Technician, signal the performers when they are on, ensure that the stage is all set and safe for the performance, etc.

"Listen to the stage manager and get on stage when they tell you to. No one has time for the rock star. None of the techs backstage care if you're David Bowie or the milkman. When you act like a jerk, they are completely unimpressed with the infantile display that you might think comes with your dubious status. They were there hours before you building the stage, and they will be there hours after you leave tearing it down. They should get your salary, and you should get theirs." -Henry Rollins

The nature of most productions result in the technical crew being on-site for significant periods of time; both leading up to and after a performance.

Identifying the technical crew
Most often, though not exclusively, members of the technical crew will be wearing black or similarly dark-coloured clothing in order to be fairly inconspicuous, so that they are not particularly distracting to the audience in the carrying out of their routines and tasks. Occasionally, larger scale or touring productions will provide clothing branded with the name and/or date of the production.

See also
Film crew
International Alliance of Theatrical Stage Employees
Stage management

 

Entertainment occupations
Mass media occupations
Stagecraft
Stage crew
Theatrical occupations